2014 Men's European Water Polo Championship Qualifiers are series of qualification tournaments to decide the participants of the 2014 Men's European Water Polo Championship, running from 4 April 2013 to 12 April 2014.

Teams directly qualified to the 2014 EWPC
 (Winners, 2012 Men's European Water Polo Championship)
 (Runners-up, 2012 Men's European Water Polo Championship)
 Hosts, (3rd Place, 2012 Men's European Water Polo Championship)
 (4th Place, 2012 Men's European Water Polo Championship)
 (5th Place, 2012 Men's European Water Polo Championship)
 (6th Place, 2012 Men's European Water Polo Championship)

Teams received byes to the qualifying round 3
 (7th Place, 2012 Men's European Water Polo Championship)
 (8th Place, 2012 Men's European Water Polo Championship)
 (9th Place, 2012 Men's European Water Polo Championship)
 (10th Place, 2012 Men's European Water Polo Championship)
 (11th Place, 2012 Men's European Water Polo Championship)
 (12th Place, 2012 Men's European Water Polo Championship)

Qualifying round 1

Group A

Group B

Group C

Qualifying round 2

Group D

Group E

Group F

Qualifying round 3
A home-and-away aggregate-goals playoff round was arranged between the six pre-qualified teams and the best six teams from the Round 2, played on February 15 and April 12, 2014. The winners of the playoffs qualified for the 2014 Men's European Water Polo Championship.

|}

References

Men
Men's European Water Polo Championship
Euro
Euro